Suyundyukovo (Höyöndök) is a rural locality (a village) in Ilchigulovsky Selsoviet, Uchalinsky District, Bashkortostan, Russia. The population was 117 as of 2010. There are 2 streets.

Geography 
Suyundyukovo is located 77 km northeast of Uchaly (the district's administrative centre) by road. Kuchukovo is the nearest rural locality.

References 

Rural localities in Uchalinsky District